Jim Davis (1887–1934) was a pioneer Australian rugby league footballer. He was one of his country's first national representative players making the 1908–09 Kangaroo tour of Great Britain and then had a patchy first grade club career in the first decade of the code's popularity in Sydney.

Career

Club
Davis had been a South Sydney rugby union junior before he joined the new South Sydney rugby league club in its inaugural 1908 season.  He initially played three seasons with club and was sent off in the 1910 Grand Final played against Newtown. He played the 1911 NSWRFL season with North Sydney before playing three seasons with the Glebe club. His top-grade career finished up back at Souths in 1918-19 before concluding with a country stint at Parkes.

Representative 
Davis made his debut Test appearance in 1908 against New Zealand, appearing in both matches of the first rugby league international series played by an Australian representative side. At the end of that season he was selected in the 35 man squad to make the first ever Kangaroo Tour. Davis played in six tour matches but in none of the three Test matches played. In the 1909 season he returned to test selection playing in the first test against New Zealand. He is listed on the Australian Players Register as Kangaroo No. 3.

Death
Davis became depressed when unable to find work during the Depression, and in 1934 he killed himself. The inquest into his death was held at Parkes, New South Wales on the 22 February 1934. Davis's body was found in the Peoples Park, Parkes on the morning of 9 February 1934. The deceased's wrists had been cut, and the verdict was suicide. A suicide note was also produced during the Inquest.

References

Bibliography
 Whiticker, Alan & Hudson, Glen (2006) The Encyclopedia of Rugby League Players, Gavin Allen Publishing, Sydney

1887 births
1934 suicides
Australian rugby league players
Australia national rugby league team players
New South Wales rugby league team players
Suicides in New South Wales
South Sydney Rabbitohs players
North Sydney Bears players
Glebe rugby league players
Rugby league second-rows
Rugby league locks
Rugby league players from Sydney
Suicides by sharp instrument in Australia